"Acrobats (Looking for Balance)" is a song by the Italian dance singer Moony. It was released in 2003 on Warner Music Group and Airplane Records as the second single and as well as the opening track from her debut studio album, Lifestories (2003). It is a house song that was written by Monica Bragato, Andrea Salvato and Mullegarth and produced by Frankie Tamburo and Mauro Ferrucci.

Track listing

Charts

References

External links
 
 
 
 
 

2003 singles
2002 songs
Moony songs
Warner Music Group singles